In mathematics, a homology theory in algebraic topology is compactly supported if, in every degree n, the relative homology group Hn(X, A) of every pair of spaces

(X, A)

is naturally isomorphic to the direct limit of the nth relative homology groups of pairs (Y, B), where Y varies over compact subspaces of X and B varies over compact subspaces of A.

Singular homology is compactly supported, since each singular chain is a finite sum of simplices, which are compactly supported. Strong homology is not compactly supported.

If one has defined a homology theory over compact pairs, it is possible to extend it into a compactly supported homology theory in the wider category of Hausdorff pairs (X, A) with A closed in X, by defining that the homology of a Hausdorff pair (X, A) is the direct limit over pairs (Y, B), where Y, B are compact, Y is a subset of X, and B is a subset of A.

References

Homology theory